Downtown Sylva Historic District is a national historic district located at Sylva, Jackson County, North Carolina. The district encompasses 41 contributing buildings and 3 contributing structures in the central business district of Sylva.  They are dated between about 1900 and 1964, and include notable examples of Italianate, Classical Revival, Modern Movement,  Queen Anne, and  American Craftsman style architecture. Notable buildings include the C. J. Harris Building (c. 1900-1908), New Jackson Hotel (c. 1920, 1926), Medford Furniture Company (1923), Great Atlantic and Pacific Tea
Company (1925), the Sylvan Theatre (1927) designed by architect Douglas Ellington, Jackson County Bank's Sylva branch (1926), Cogdill Motors (1934), Moody Funeral Home (1946), Saint John's Episcopal Church (1956), and the United States Post Office (1964).

It was listed on the National Register of Historic Places in 2014.

References

Historic districts on the National Register of Historic Places in North Carolina
Italianate architecture in North Carolina
Neoclassical architecture in North Carolina
Queen Anne architecture in North Carolina
Buildings and structures in Jackson County, North Carolina
National Register of Historic Places in Jackson County, North Carolina